Chili powder (also spelled chile, chilli, or, alternatively, powdered chili) is the dried, pulverized fruit of one or more varieties of chili pepper, sometimes with the addition of other spices (in which case it is also sometimes known as chili powder blend or chili seasoning mix). It is used as a spice (or spice blend) to add pungency (piquancy) and flavor to culinary dishes. In American English, the spelling is usually "chili"; in British English, "chilli" (with two "l"s) is used consistently.

Chili powder is used in many different cuisines, including American (particularly Tex-Mex), Chinese, Indian, Bangladeshi, Korean, Mexican, Portuguese, and Thai. A chili powder blend is the primary flavor in American chili con carne.

Varieties 

Chili powder is sometimes known by the specific type of chili pepper used. Varieties of chili peppers used to make chili powder include Aleppo, ancho, cayenne, chipotle, chile de árbol, jalapeño, New Mexico, pasilla, and piri piri chili peppers. Gochugaru is a variety used in Korean cuisine traditionally made from sun-dried Korean red chili peppers known as taeyang-cho, with spicier varieties using Cheongyang peppers. Kashmiri chili powder is bright red, but mild in heat and used in Indian cuisine, named after the region of Kashmir.

Traceability of unknown chili powders can be detected by using spectrophotometry methods. Studies had found that origin of chili powders can be detected by analysing the trace elements in the chili powder.

Blends 
Chili powder blends are composed chiefly of chili peppers and blended with other spices including cumin, onion, garlic powder, and sometimes salt. The chilis are most commonly red chili peppers; "hot" varieties usually also include cayenne pepper. As a result of the varying recipes used, the spiciness of any given chili powder is variable.

The first commercial blends of chili powder in the U.S. were created by D.C. Pendery and William Gebhardt for chili con carne. Gebhardt opened Miller's Saloon in New Braunfels, Texas. Chili was the town's favorite dish. However, chili peppers could only be found at certain times of the year. Gebhardt imported some ancho peppers from Mexico and ran the peppers through a small meat grinder three times and created the first commercial chili powder in 1894.

Chili in food 
Chili powder is very commonly seen in traditional Latin American, west Asian and east European cuisines. It is used in soups, tacos, enchiladas, fajitas, curries and meat.

Chili can also be found in sauces and curry bases, such as chili con carne. Chili sauce can be used to marinate and season things such as meat.

See also 

 Crushed red pepper
 Food powder
 Paprika

References

External links
 
 

Chili pepper dishes
Korean cuisine
Spices
Chili